Diclazepam (Ro5-3448), also known as chlorodiazepam and 2'-chloro-diazepam, is a benzodiazepine  and functional analog of diazepam. It was first synthesized by Leo Sternbach and his team at Hoffman-La Roche in 1960. It is not currently approved for use as a medication, but rather sold as an unscheduled substance. Efficacy and safety have not been tested in humans.

In animal models, its effects are similar to diazepam, possessing long-acting anxiolytic, anticonvulsant, hypnotic, sedative, skeletal muscle relaxant, and amnestic properties.

Metabolism 
Metabolism of this compound has been assessed, revealing diclazepam has an approximate elimination half-life of 42 hours and undergoes N-demethylation to delorazepam, which can be detected in urine for 6 days following administration of the parent compound. Other metabolites detected were lorazepam and lormetazepam which were detectable in urine for 19 and 11 days, respectively, indicating hydroxylation by cytochrome P450 enzymes occurring concurrently with N-demethylation.

Legal status

United Kingdom 
In the UK, diclazepam has been classified as a Class C drug by the May 2017 amendment to The Misuse of Drugs Act 1971 along with several other benzodiazepine drugs.

United States 
On the 23rd of December 2022, the Drug Enforcement Administration announced its intent to place Diclazepam into Schedule I.

See also 
 Diazepam
 Difludiazepam
 Delorazepam (Nordiclazepam)
 Lorazepam
 Phenazepam
 Ro09-9212
 Ro5-4864 (4'-Chlorodiazepam)
 Ro07-5220 (6'-Chlorodiclazepam)

References 

Abandoned drugs
Benzodiazepines
GABAA receptor positive allosteric modulators
Designer drugs
Chlorobenzenes